"Grbavica" is a song recorded by Bosnian rock vocalist Mladen Vojičić Tifa for his fourth studio album of the same name (1997). It was written by Dragan Jokić and composed by Mustafa  Čizmić.

Writing, composing and recordings
"Grbavica" was first recorded in 1993 by prominent Bosnian rock vocalist Mladen Vojičić Tifa, in Sarajevo under the siege, during the Bosnian War. After the war in 1997, following the song's huge popularity especially among Sarajevo residents, Tifa included Grbavica as the title song of his eponymous solo rock-album of the same name. The song also became the unofficial anthem for Sarajevo-based football club FK Željezničar Sarajevo, and the most popular chant amongst the club's main supporti group.

Popularity and receptions
Željezničar's main support group, The Maniacs, and its many affiliate sub-groups, perform Grbavica before the kick-off in every game at home stadium Grbavica.

Background
Grbavica is an urban neighborhood in the city of Sarajevo, across the Miljacka river which cuts through the city's longitudinally. During the period of the siege in the war, from 1992 until reintegration in 1996, the neighborhood saw heavy fighting, with all of its non-Serb population murdered or expelled, while its many urban parts with architectural and public landmarks, such as the iconic Hotel Bristol and Grbavica Stadium, ended being burnt or razed to the ground. The stadium, home-ground of FK Željezničar, was hit by numerous large caliber and incendiary ammunition and ordnance from Bosnian Serb forces positions with heavy artillery, getting eventually incinerated. After initially bombing its pitch, it was turned into the front line and laden with many land-mines by Serb militias.

Lyrics
"Grbavica" lyrics in Bosnian and English.

See also
FK Željezničar Sarajevo
Grbavica
Grbavica Stadium
The Maniacs

References

External links
THE MANIACS – CHANT 'GRBAVICA' – Ultras Channel TifoTV on YouTube

1993 songs
Hard rock ballads
Bosnian-language songs
FK Željezničar Sarajevo songs